Senator Connelly or Connolly may refer to:

Henry C. Connelly (1832–1912), New York State Senate
Michael Connelly (Illinois politician), Illinois State Senate
Mike Connolly (Iowa politician) (born 1945), Iowa State Senate
Richard B. Connolly (1810–1880), New York State Senate

See also
Tom Connally (1877–1963), U.S. Senator from Texas from 1929 to 1953.
Matt Connealy (born 1951), Nebraska State Senate
John H. Conolly (1935–1988), Illinois State Senate
Senator Conley (disambiguation)
Senator Connell (disambiguation)